The 2019–20 FC Red Bull Salzburg season was the 87th season in club history, in which Red Bull Salzburg successfully defended their League and Cup titles from the previous season.

Season events
On 6 June, Jesse Marsch was announced as Red Bull Salzburg's new manager.

In June, Gideon Mensah signed a new contract with Red Bull Salzburg, keeping him at the club until 31 May 2024, with Majeed Ashimeru also signing a five-year contract later in the month.

On 13 August, Diadie Samassékou left Red Bull Salzburg to join TSG 1899 Hoffenheim, and Maximilian Wöber joined on a five-year contract from Sevilla.

On 29 August, Mahamadou Dembélé left Red Bull Salzburg to sign a permanent deal with Troyes.

On 30 August, Gideon Mensah moved to Zulte Waregem on loan for the season, Youba Diarra signed a new contract until May 2024 and joined St. Pauli on loan for the season.

On 18 December, Red Bull Salzburg extended their contracts with Enock Mwepu, Sékou Koïta and Patson Daka until the summer of 2024.

On 19 December, Red Bull Salzburg and Liverpool agreed the transfer of Takumi Minamino to Liverpool, to be finalised on 1 January 2020.

On 29 December, Red Bull Salzburg announced that Erling Haaland had agreed to join Borussia Dortmund, with the deal being finalised on 3 January 2020.

On 6 January, Mërgim Berisha returned early from his loan deal with SCR Altach, whilst Anderson Niangbo returned from his loan deal with Wolfsberger AC on 7 January.

On 9 January, Kilian Ludewig moved to Barnsley on loan for the rest of the season, whilst Jasper van der Werff joined Basel on an 18-month long loan deal and extended his contract with Red Bull Salzburg until 31 May 2023.

On 15 January Anderson Niangbo, moved permanently to Gent, and Marin Pongračić joined VfL Wolfsburg permanently.

On 19 January, Karim Adeyemi extended his contract with Red Bull Salzburg until the summer of 2024.

On 29 January, Youba Diarra returned to Red Bull Salzburg from his loan deal at St. Pauli due to a knee injury.

On 31 January, Smail Prevljak left Red Bull Salzburg to join K.A.S. Eupen on loan for the remainder of the season, and Noah Okafor signed for Red Bull Salzburg on a contract until the summer of 2024.

On 10 March, all Bundesliga games were postponed due to the COVID-19 pandemic.

On 13 May, the Bundesliga announced the resumption of games starting on 1 June.

Squad

Out on loan

Transfers

In

Out

Loans out

Released

Kits

Friendlies

Competitions

Overview

Bundesliga

Regular stage

Results summary

Results by round

Results

Table

Championship stage

Results summary

Results by round

Results

League table

Austrian Cup

UEFA Champions League

Group stage

UEFA Europa League

Knockout phase

Statistics

Appearances and goals

|-
|colspan="14"|Players also registered for Liefering :
|-
|colspan="14"|Players away on loan :

|-
|colspan="14"|Players who left Red Bull Salzburg during the season:

|}

Goalscorers

Clean Sheets

Disciplinary Record

References

FC Red Bull Salzburg seasons
Red Bull Salzburg
Red Bull Salzburg
Austrian football championship-winning seasons